Black Pond is a low-budget independent film by young British directors Tom Kingsley and Will Sharpe. The film was nominated for the 2012 BAFTA Outstanding British Debut Award. The film stars Chris Langham in his first acting role since he was convicted on child pornography charges. The film is reported as having cost £25,000 to make.

Premise
Black Pond is a black comedy in which a family is accused of murder after a stranger comes to dinner.

Plot

Premiere
Screen International reported that "The film premiered at the Raindance Film Festival, going on to be nominated for the Raindance award at the BIFAs and two Evening Standard Awards for Best Debut and Best Comedy."
The Guardian reported that the film had been shortlisted for the Guardian First Film Award.

References

External links

2011 comedy-drama films
British comedy-drama films
British black comedy films
British independent films
2011 directorial debut films
2011 films
2010s English-language films
2010s British films